The Ruins of Mujada or the Lighthouse of al-Mawqada is a historic ruin located to the west of the city of Karbala, Iraq. The historical origin of the ruins is unknown.

See also
 Mesopotamia

References

History of Iraq
Karbala
Buildings and structures in Iraq